Robert K. Yin is an American social scientist and President of COSMOS Corporation, known for his work on case study research as well as on qualitative research. Over the years, his work on case study research has been frequently cited. Google Scholar listed it as the second most cited methodological work, qualitative or quantitative, over a 20-year period

Life and work 
Yin obtained his BA in history, magna cum laude, from Harvard College, and successfully pursued his graduate studies at Massachusetts Institute of Technology, where he obtained his PhD in brain and cognitive sciences.

While at graduate school, Yin published his first articles on face recognition, in the field of experimental psychology and neuroscience. Later, his research interests shifted to the use of case study research and qualitative research in public policy and related topics. An exemplary example of a case study, relying on both qualitative and quantitative methods, covered organizational innovations in public services. More broadly, Yin's text on case study research received the McGuffey Longevity Award in 2019, as a text that had been published for over 30 years and that was still in print.

In 1980, Yin founded COSMOS Corporation. He developed COSMOS as a research corporation for "applied research and evaluation, technical support, and management assistance aimed at improving public policy, private enterprise, and collaborative ventures." Yin has also been affiliated with the University of Copenhagen, the RAND Corporation, the United Nations Development Programme, and the School for International Service at American University. More recently, he has worked with faculty and students at the School of Education at Southern New Hampshire University, as well as the Division of Special Education and disAbility Research at George Mason University. He has collaborated regularly on evaluation projects with The World Bank.

Selected publications 
 Yin, Robert K. Case study research: Design and methods. Sage publications, 1984; 1989; 1994; 2003; 2009; 2014.
Yin, Robert K. Case study research and applications: Design and methods. Sage publications, 2018
 Yin, Robert K. Qualitative research from start to finish. Guilford Press, 2010; 2016.
 Yin, Robert K. Applications of case study research. Sage, 2011.

Articles, a selection
 Yin, Robert K. "Looking at upside-down faces." Journal of experimental psychology 81.1 (1969): 141-145.
 Yin, Robert K. "Face recognition by brain-injured patients: a dissociable ability?." Neuropsychologia 8.4 (1970): 395-402.
 Yin, Robert K. "The case study crisis: Some answers." Administrative science quarterly (1981): 58-65.
 Yin, Robert K. "The case study as a serious research strategy." Science communication 3.1 (1981): 97-114.

References

External links 
 COSMOS Corporation profile

Living people
American social scientists
Harvard College alumni
Massachusetts Institute of Technology School of Science alumni
Academic staff of the University of Copenhagen
American University faculty and staff
George Mason University faculty
Southern New Hampshire University faculty
Year of birth missing (living people)